The  is a dam in the city of Ōno in the Fukui Prefecture of Japan. The dam supports a 220 MW hydroelectric power station.

As a result of the series of developments, 530 private houses, 191 hectares of farmland, 868 hectares of forest and 81 km of roads in Izumi village were to be submerged.

References

Dams in Fukui Prefecture
Dams completed in 1968